Mariakerke may refer to:

 Mariakerke (East Flanders), a part of the city of Ghent
 Mariakerke (West Flanders), a part of the city of Ostend